The 1935 French Championships (now known as the French Open) was a tennis tournament that took place on the outdoor clay courts at the Stade Roland-Garros in Paris, France. The tournament ran from 21 May until 2 June. It was the 40th staging of the French Championships and the second Grand Slam tournament of the year. Fred Perry and Hilde Sperling won the singles titles.

Finals

Men's singles

 Fred Perry (GBR) defeated  Gottfried von Cramm (GER) 6–3, 3–6, 6–1, 6–3

Women's singles

 Hilde Sperling (DEN) defeated  Simonne Mathieu (FRA) 6–2, 6–1

Men's doubles
 Jack Crawford /  Adrian Quist defeated  Vivian McGrath /  Don Turnbull  6–1, 6–4, 6–2

Women's doubles
 Margaret Scriven  /  Kay Stammers defeated  Ida Adamoff /  Hilde Krahwinkel Sperling  6–4, 6–0

Mixed doubles
 Lolette Payot /  Marcel Bernard  defeated  Sylvie Jung Henrotin /  André Martin-Legeay  4–6, 6–2, 6–4

References

External links
 French Open official website

French Championships
French Championships (tennis) by year
French Champ
French Championships (tennis)
French Championships (tennis)
French Championships (tennis)